Elappara is a village in Idukki district in the Indian state of Kerala. It is one of the panchayaths in Peerumedu taluk. Elappara is famous for its vast tea plantations.

History 
The history of present Elappara begins in 1836 with the clearing of the Vembanadu region by Henry Baker, a C.M.S. missionary. The first estate to start the tea industry in high-range was the Tyford estate and the first plantation Penshwarast - both of which are situated in Elappara panchayath. 

During the Kollam era, the regions including Elappara were a part of the Thekkumkur kingdom and were later acquired by Manavikrama Kulasekara Perumal, the founder of the Poonjar dynasty. History says that Manavikrama was on his journey to Poonjar and took rest at 'Thangalpara,' near Kolahalamedu. Even today we can see the remnants of Minakshi idols in the rocks, indicating its history. In the 1870s, various plantations had emerged in this region. The tea cultivated here was known by the name Peerumedu hybrid tea, a type native to China. By 1896, the area was fully utilized for tea cultivation. Later, in the 1900s, the people that worked in these plantations permanently settled there.

Administration 
Elappara panchayath was formed in 1953, including 17 wards, and it belongs to the Azhutha block of Peerumedu taluk. The surrounding panchayaths are Ayyappancoil, Upputhara, Kokkayar, Peruvanthanam, and Kumily.

Wards in Elappara panchayath

Pullikkanam
Uluppooni
Kottamala
Vattapathal
Kochu Karumtharuvi
Chemmannu
Chinnar
Vallakkadavu
Haileyburia	
Kizhakke puthuval	
Kozhikkanam
Thannikanam	
Elappara	
Tyford	
Bonami	
Kolahalamedu	
Vagamon

Economy 
Elappara is predominantly a plantation township with its abundant tea plantations. Most people work in plantations. This hill area is known for the Elappara Tea estate and its brand MASCO. Kerala's main agricultural products are cultivated in this region.
Elappara is surrounded by tea estates namely the Tyford Tea Ltd, MMJ Plantations, Haileyburia Tea Estates Ltd., etc.

Religion
The majority of the population is Hindu, Christian, or Muslim. Important pilgrim centers are the Luther Mission Church at Bonami, the Uppukulam Shree Krishna Swami Temple, and the Muhiyudeen Juma Masjid. 

Muslims are a comparatively smaller part of the population.

Tourism 
The natural environment and landscapes of Elappara attract visitors. There are panoramic views from the roads leading from Elappara to Kuttikkanam and Vagamon. The Annan Thambi and Pullikkanan hills, meadows at Kolahalamedu, scenic Vedikuzhi, Elappara streams, and the numerous tea plantations are the main attractions for the visitors. Vagamon, a hill station in Idukki, is just 15 km from Elappara. The Periyar Wildlife Sanctuary and Mullaperiyar dam is situated near to this panchayath.

Transportation 
Elappara is located on the Kattappana - Kuttikkanam state highway, situated about 8 km (5.0 mi) from Kuttikkanam and 32 km (20 mi) from Kattappana. Major long route buses to Kottayam and Changanassery stop here. Bus services are also available to places like Vandiperiyar, Kumily, Vagamon, Erattupetta, and Pala regions.

Demographics
As of 2011 Census, Elappara had a population of 18,714 with 9,284 males and 9,430 females. The average sex ratio was 1016 lower than the state average of 1084. In Elappara, 8.8% of the population was under 6 years of age. Elappara had an average literacy of 89.6% higher than the national average of 74% and lower than the state average of 94%.

See also
 Kattappana
 Kuttikkanam
 Upputhara
 Ayyappancoil

References

Villages in Idukki district